The aes uxorium was a Roman tax paid by those who reached adulthood without marrying, with the exception of the Vestal Virgins.

History
It was first imposed by the censors in 403 BC under the Lex Papia Poppaea. It was one of the many measures against caelibes (celibates), unless they married within 100 days. Not only did they have to pay the tax, but also they could not have a hereditas or a legacy (legatum). A man, when he attained the age of sixty, and a woman, when she attained the age of fifty, were not included within certain penalties of the law.  If they had not obeyed the law before attaining those respective ages, they were perpetually bound by its penalties by a senatus consultum Pernicianum. A senatus consultum Claudianum so far modified the strictness of the new rule as to give a man who married above sixty the same advantage that he would have had if had married under sixty, provided he married a woman who was under fifty; the ground of which rule was the legal notion that a woman under fifty was still capable of having children. If the woman was above fifty and the man under sixty, this was called Impar Matrimonium, and by a senatus consultum Calvitianum it was entirely without effect as to releasing from incapacity to take legata and dotes. On the death of the woman, therefore, the dos became caduca.

See also 
 Bachelor tax
 Ehestandshilfe
 Tax on childlessness

References

Attribution

Taxation in ancient Rome
Taxes promoting marriage and reproduction